Reuben A. Reeves (August 9, 1821 – January 30, 1908) was a justice of the Supreme Court of Texas from November 1864 to June 1866, and again from January 1874 to April 1876.

In 1885, President Grover Cleveland appointed Reeves to the territorial New Mexico Supreme Court, where Reeves served until 1889.

References

1821 births
1908 deaths
Justices of the Texas Supreme Court
Justices of the New Mexico Supreme Court
United States Article I federal judges appointed by Grover Cleveland